Michael Linder is an American television producer and broadcast journalist based in Los Angeles, currently an investigative reporter for KABC-AM and an executive producer for Natural 9 Entertainment in Burbank. He is a contributor to BBC Radio 5 Live and KUSC.

Linder created and executive produced America's Most Wanted in 1988, casting host John Walsh and launching the first hit series on the nascent Fox television network. He left the program in 1990.

In 1990, Linder created and executive produced The Jesse Jackson Show leading a crew and host Jackson to interview Saddam Hussein in Baghdad as troops massed for the Gulf War and negotiating the release of 227 hostages held by Hussein in Kuwait City and Baghdad, including the staff of the U.S. embassy in Kuwait City.

In 1995-6 Linder created and produced "Berserkistan" with photojournalist Jim Bartlett, credited as the first Internet site to cover a war (Bosnia) on location.

From 2004 through 2009, Linder served as a radio journalist for KNX-AM.

Notes

External links
 Home page
 Michael Linder at KABC
 Michael Jackson trial blog

American male journalists
Year of birth missing (living people)
American television executives
America's Most Wanted
Living people
Place of birth missing (living people)